The Three Radio Theremin was originally created by Tomoya Yamamoto
.  The theremin is constructed by tuning 3 separate radios to create a system that acts similar to a stand-alone theremin.  The circuitry in each individual radio is used to functionally modulate the sound out of the third, producing similar tonal qualities as a theremin.

The following process can be used to produce the same effect:
 Find 3 sets of  Amplitude Modulated (AM) Radios of superheterodyne receiver type
 Place set 3 radio between set1 and set 2
 Set 1 and Set 2 radios tuned to 1145 kHz and set 3 to 1600 kHz so that local oscillators of set 1 and 2 well received by set 3 radio
 Local oscillator of set 1 and 2 may produce beat sound in set 3 
 Manipulate hand over set 1 antenna to change the frequency of beat sound
 Volume of beat sound  reduced by covering set 3 radio with hand.

References

Theremins